Anisodon (Greek: "unequal" (anisos), "teeth" (odontes)) is an extinct genus of chalicothere that lived in Europe during the late Miocene. It stood at about 150 cm and weighed around 600 kg. It is thought that the animal's clawed forelimbs would have allowed it to pull down tree branches in order to browse, as well as deter Miocene predators such as bear-dogs and saber-toothed cats.

References

Further reading 
 
 

Chalicotheres
Miocene mammals of Europe
Miocene odd-toed ungulates